= International Institute of Peace and Development Studies =

Thai research institute

- Abbreviation: IIPDS
- Formation: 2005; 21 years ago
- Type: Research and training institute
- Headquarters: Bangkok, Thailand
- Staff: Ca. 10
- Website: arf-int.org/about-us-iipds/

The International Institute of Peace and Development Studies (IIPDS) is an independent peace, conflict and development studies research institution, based in Bangkok, Thailand. It was founded in 2005 by the Asian Ressource Foundation (ARF), in order to offer courses and runs workshops across Asia on peace studies, development and human rights. The IIPDS also develops part of its research activities through the publication of journals and scientific works.

== History and governance ==
IIPDS was founded in 2005 by the Asian Ressource Foundation (ARF), an international organization founded in 1996 and whose objective is to bring an Asian initiative to meet the needs of vulnerable communities in the field of education of children, child rights, women empowerment and youth leadership development. The IIPDS was therefore created to meet a need for training and research in the field of peace and development in order to provide scientific support to all contemporary humanitarian issues.

Mr. Abdus Sabur is the convenor of the International Institute of Peace and Development Studies and the president of ARF.

== Training ==
The main training activity of IIPDS is the School of Peace Studies and Conflict Transformation which takes place once a year at IIPDS headquarters in Bangkok. Launched in 2006, this annual school focuses on training on mechanisms for understanding peace and conflict in international and local contexts, on positive conflict transformation and the prevention of violence.

== Research ==
In addition to regular IIPDS publications, the institute regularly issues reports on specific subjects, as well as books compiling several works by researchers, in cooperation with ARF
